Des Murs's wiretail (Sylviorthorhynchus desmursii) is a small passerine bird of southern South America which belongs to the ovenbird family Furnariidae. Molecular phylogenetics places it within the Synallaxinae and indicates that the genus diverged from the Leptasthenura about 14-15 million years ago.

Description
The tail consists of just six feathers which are very narrow and filament-like: so few rectrices are elsewhere seen only in the emu-wrens of Australia. The two central feathers are greatly elongated while the two outer feathers are very short. The plain plumage is reddish-brown above, paler on the underparts. There is a pale stripe above the eye. The bird is small and rounded with a very fine bill. The song is fast and high-pitched.

Distribution and habitat
It is found in western Argentina from Santa Cruz Province north to San Juan and in southern and central Chile from northern Magallanes to Valparaíso Region. It inhabits dense thickets of Chusquea bamboo within cool temperate rainforests, occurring from sea-level up to 1,200 metres, but also can occur in early-successional shrublands of highly shade-tolerant Myrtaceae species, chiefly Amomyrtus. Des Murs's wiretail is also known to occur in dense weedy thickets of plants like gorse over the northern extremity of its range.

Behaviour and ecology

When encountered Des Murs's wiretail can easily be mistaken for a mouse. It has the unique ability among birds to curl up its long tail into a ball when alarmed.

The ball-shaped nest is made of plant fibres and built amongst vegetation close to the ground. This territory and the nest site are defended vigorously against conspecifics with a distinctive territorial song, and it is possible that the long tail is used by both sexes as an means of choosing a mate, though no actual tests have been used to determine how wiretails find a mate.

As is typical for south temperate insectivorous birds, during the breeding season of October to February Des Murs's wiretail lays a clutch of two to four eggs, but for the bird's mass these are about the largest eggs of any passerine bird. Little is known about incubation, fledging periods, or postfledging parental care due to the very secretive nature of the species.

References

Jaramillo, Alvaro; Burke, Peter & Beadle, David (2003) Field Guide to the Birds of Chile. Christopher Helm, London.

External links
Des Murs's wiretail in IBC (Internet Bird Collection.
Des Murs's wiretail sounds in Xenocanto.

Des Murs's wiretail
Birds of Chile
Des Murs's wiretail
Taxobox binomials not recognized by IUCN